Euspondylus auyanensis is a species of lizard in the family Gymnophthalmidae. It is endemic to Venezuela.

References

Euspondylus
Reptiles of Venezuela
Endemic fauna of Venezuela
Reptiles described in 2009
Taxa named by Charles W. Myers
Taxa named by Gilson Rivas
Taxa named by Robert C. Jadin